Theppitak Poonjuang (born July 30, 1998) is a Thai professional footballer who plays as a midfielder for Thai League 2 club Rayong.

References

External links
 

1998 births
Living people
Theppitak Poonjuang
Theppitak Poonjuang
Association football midfielders
Theppitak Poonjuang
Theppitak Poonjuang